Mohd Khairul Ramadhan bin Mohd Zauwawi (born 2 February 1988 in Kuala Terengganu) is a Malaysian footballer currently playing for Terengganu City in Malaysia FAM League.

References

External links
 

1988 births
Living people
Malaysian people of Malay descent
Malaysian footballers
Terengganu FC players
PKNS F.C. players
People from Terengganu
Association football midfielders